Alva Academy is a six-year comprehensive school serving the towns and villages of Alva, Menstrie, Tillicoultry, Coalsnaughton, Devonside, Dollar and Muckhart, all in Clackmannanshire, Scotland. The roll is over 900. It has six associated primaries - Alva, Menstrie, Tillicoultry, Coalsnaughton, Strathdevon and Muckhart.

History
The original Alva Academy was established in the 1860s by public subscriptions from residents of the town to overcome the shortcomings of educational provision. Educational change and a constantly rising school roll forced regular change to meet growing demands. The advent of comprehensive education in 1967/68 saw the linking of Tillicoultry and Alva Schools into a six-year comprehensive.

Following a Clackmannanshire Council decision in 1997 to integrate pupils with Moderate Learning Difficulties into a mainstream secondary school, Alva Academy was chosen as the location for this development. MLD pupils in S3 to S6 experience a full and varied curriculum which is integrated with mainstream subjects at appropriate levels.

Sources
Alva Academy
Alva Academy's page on Scottish Schools Online

Secondary schools in Clackmannanshire
Educational institutions established in the 1860s
Alva, Clackmannanshire